The Gauliga Bayern was the highest association football league in the German state of Bavaria from 1933 to 1945. Shortly after the formation of the league, the Nazis reorganised the administrative regions in Germany, and the five Gaue Bayreuth, Munich-Upper Bavaria, Swabia, Main Franconia  and Franconia de facto replaced the state of Bavaria which remained only as a symbolic region.

Overview
The league was introduced by the Nazi Sports Office in 1933, after the Nazi takeover of power in Germany and Bavaria. It replaced the Bezirksliga Bayern as the highest level of play in German football competitions. Up until 1963, Germany did not have a nationwide highest league but rather operated on regional divisions with the winners of those entering a finals round for the German championship.

The Gauliga Bayern was established with twelve clubs from the state of Bavaria, but without any teams from the Palatinate region (German:Pfalz), then politically a part of Bavaria but not geographically connected to the rest of the state. The clubs from this region traditionally never played in the Bavarian leagues and were now added to the Gauliga Südwest/Mainhessen. The football clubs from Ulm, which had been playing in the Bavarian league system until 1933, now joined the Gauliga Württemberg.

The Gauliga replaced as such the two Bezirksligas of northern and southern Bavaria. The arrival of the Gauliga heralded somewhat the decline of Bavarian football. The 1. FC Nürnberg and SpVgg Fürth still dominated the Bavarian league but the national success both clubs had, especially in the 1920s, faded away. Until 1937, Nürnberg still made three more appearances in the German final and won in 1936, but no other Bavarian club had any success on the national championship level. Only in the German cup competition, the Tschammerpokal, did Nürnberg (1935, 1939) and 1860 Munich (1942) win some more titles.

In its first season, the league had twelve clubs, playing each other once at home and once away. The league winner qualified for the German championship while the bottom three teams were relegated. Over the next two seasons, the league was reduced at first to eleven, then ten teams. From 1935 to 1936, the Gauliga Bayern had two teams relegated per season, but the modus remained unchanged otherwise.

The 1939–40 season started on 27 August 1939, but with the outbreak of the Second World War four days later, league football was suspended. It only resumed at the end of October, with a number of local city-championships having been played to bridge the gap. In 1939–40, only one team was relegated as the league reverted to twelve teams for the following season.

After the 1941–42 season, the negative effects of the Second World War became seriously visible with player shortages and transport difficulties. The league was staged in a northern (11 teams) and a southern group (10 teams) in 1942–43 and 1943–44. No overall Bavarian championship was determined and both league winners went to the German finals competition.

The imminent collapse of Nazi Germany in 1945 gravely affected the Gauligas and in Bavaria the league was now staged in five regional groups. With the exception of the Munich division, most of the leagues had to shut down in late 1944.

Within the Bavarian capital, football games continued until almost the end of the war, with the last official game in Nazi Germany being the FC Bayern versus 1860 Munich derby on 23 April 1945, ending 3–2.

With the end of the Nazi era, the Gauligas ceased to exist and shortly after, in late 1945, in the US occupation zone in southern Germany, the Oberliga Süd came to be the highest league in this region.

Founding members of the league
The twelve founding members and their positions in the 1932–33 season were:
 1. FC Nürnberg, winner Bezirksliga Nordbayern
 TSV 1860 Munich, finished 2nd Bezirksliga Südbayern
 FC Bayern Munich, winner Bezirksliga Südbayern
 FC Schweinfurt 05, finished 3rd Bezirksliga Nordbayern
 TSV Schwaben Augsburg, finished 7th Bezirksliga Südbayern
 SpVgg Fürth, finished 2nd Bezirksliga Nordbayern
 ASV Nürnberg, finished 5th Bezirksliga Nordbayern
 Jahn Regensburg, finished 10th Bezirksliga Südbayern
 Wacker München, finished 4th Bezirksliga Südbayern
 FC Bayreuth, finished 4th Bezirksliga Nordbayern
 FV Würzburg 04, finished 7th Bezirksliga Nordbayern
 FC München, merger club of Teutonia (8th) and DSC München (6th)

Winners and runners-up of the Gauliga Bayern
The winners and runners-up of the league:

Placings in the Gauliga Bayern 1933–44
In the 1942–43 and 1943–44 season, the league was split in two separate groups, North and South. The 1944–45 season was played in five separate groups but never completed.

Clubs from the northern division

 In the final seasons, especially from 1943, many clubs formed war associations (KSG) with other teams due to the lack of players and resources:
 1 FC Schweinfurt 05 and LSV Schweinfurt merged their teams to form KSG Schweinfurt.
 2 Kickers Würzburg and FV Würzburg 04 merged their teams to form KSG Würzburg.
 3 ASV Nürnberg became BSG WKG Neumeyer Nürnberg in 1938 and VfL Nürnberg in 1942.

Clubs from the southern division

 In the final seasons, especially from 1943, many clubs formed war associations (KSG) with other teams due to the lack of players and resources:
 3 BC Augsburg merged teams with Post Augsburg to form KSG BC/Post Augsburg.
 4 VfB Ingolstadt-Ringsee merged teams with MTV Ingolstadt to form KSG Ingolstadt.

References

Sources
 Die deutschen Gauligen 1933–45 – Heft 1–3  Tables of the Gauligas 1933–45, publisher: DSFS
 Kicker Almanach,  The yearbook on German football from Bundesliga to Oberliga, since 1937, published by the Kicker Sports Magazine
 Süddeutschlands Fussballgeschichte in Tabellenform 1897–1988  History of Southern German football in tables, publisher & author: Ludolf Hyll

External links
 The Gauligas  Das Deutsche Fussball Archiv
 Germany – Championships 1902–1945 at RSSSF.com

Gauliga
1
Sports leagues established in 1933
1933 establishments in Germany
1945 disestablishments in Germany